The Scania Freight Corridor is a  long railway line between Arlöv and Ängelholm in Sweden. 

It is an amalgamation of the Lomma Line between Arlöv and Kävlinge, and the Söderås Line between Teckomatorp and Åstorp. The Continental line to the port of Trelleborg is sometimes also regarded as a part of the Corridor, although retaining its separate name officially.

History
Originally the section from Arlöv to Ängelholm consisted of two private railways, from Arlöv to Billesholm, which opened in 1888, and from Billeshollm to Ängelholm, which opened in 1876. Both were nationalized in 1896 along with many other railways to establish the West Coast Line. The section from Arlöv to Ängelhom was part of the West Coast Line until 2001, when a new line was opened between Ängelholm and Lund. 

The Scania Freight Corridor was electrified in 1933 and 1934. Regional passenger transport was terminated in 1975 from Ängelholm to Teckomatorp, and in 1983 from Malmö to Arlöv and Kävlinge. The section from Kävlinge to Teckomatorp remains as a passenger train section and is used by the Skåne commuter rail.

Today and future
Today the Scania Freight Corridor is not used much, since there is a bottleneck. The West Coast Line north of Ängelholm over the Hallandsås ridge is single-track, steep and curvy and it is congested with passenger trains. Therefore, most freight trains today use the Markaryd Line, a large detour which also congests the Southern Main Line further east. A tunnel, the Hallandsås tunnel, is being built to solve this situation. This tunnel is seriously delayed. It is now planned for opening around 2015, around 20 years later than was assumed at construction start.

The Hallandsås tunnel and relocated station at Båstad was finally opened in December 2015. Thus the section over the ridge and via the old Båstad station was closed and the tracks were removed.

References

Rail infrastructure in Skåne County
Railway lines in Sweden
Railway lines opened in 1876
1876 establishments in Sweden